The Milwaukee Police Department bombing was a November 24, 1917, bomb attack that killed nine members of local law enforcement and a civilian in Milwaukee, Wisconsin, United States. The perpetrators were never caught but are suspected to be an anarchist terrorist cell operating in the United States in the early 20th century. The target was initially an evangelical church in the Third Ward and only killed the police officers when the bomb was taken to the police station by a concerned civilian. The bombing remained the most fatal single event in national law enforcement history for over 80 years until the 9/11 attacks.

The bomb

On November 24, 1917, a large black powder bomb, wrapped as a package, was discovered by Maude L. Richter, a social worker, next to an evangelical church in the Third Ward. She dragged the package into the church basement and notified the church janitor, Sam Mazzone. Mazzone took the bomb to the central police station at Oneida and Broadway and turned it over to the Milwaukee Police Department. The station keeper was showing it to the shift commander, Lieutenant Flood, right before a scheduled inspection, when it exploded. Nine members of the department were killed in the blast, along with a female civilian.

Officers killed

Nine members of the Milwaukee Police Department were killed as well as Catherine Walker, who was in the police station making a complaint against her boyfriend.

Aftermath
It was suspected at the time that the bomb had been placed outside the church by anarchists, particularly the Galleanist faction led by adherents of Luigi Galleani.  At the time, the bomber's identity was not uncovered.  Many years later, interviews with surviving Galleanist members revealed that Croatian national Mario Buda, chief bombmaker for the Galleanists, may have constructed the Milwaukee bomb. At the time, the bombing was the most fatal single event in national law enforcement history, only surpassed later by the September 11 attacks when 72 law enforcement officers representing eight different agencies were killed. Those responsible for the 1917 bombing never were apprehended, but days later, eleven alleged Italian anarchists went to trial on unrelated charges involving an incident at the evangelical church where the bomb had been found. When anarchists had disrupted a nationalistic rally held there on September 9, police opened fire, killing two anarchists and wounding two of their colleagues. The eleven had been arrested following the shooting. The specter of the larger, uncharged crime of the bombing haunted the proceedings and assured convictions of all eleven. In 1918 Clarence Darrow led an appeal that gained freedom for most of the convicted.

See also 
 List of unsolved murders (20th century)
 16th Street Baptist Church bombing
Anarchism and violence
Propaganda of the deed
 September 1920 Wall Street bombing
Palmer Raids
Espionage Act of 1917
1919 United States anarchist bombings

Bibliography 
Notes

References 
 - Total pages: 265 
 - Total pages: 323 
 - Total pages: 365 

 

 - Total pages: 268 
 - Total pages: 448 

1917 murders in the United States
1917 in Wisconsin
Explosions in 1917
November 1917 events
1910s in Milwaukee
Atheism and violence
Terrorist incidents in Milwaukee, Wisconsin
Terrorist incidents in the United States in the 1910s
Building bombings in the United States
Political violence in the United States
History of anarchism
Unsolved mass murders in the United States
Terrorist incidents by unknown perpetrators
Attacks on bank buildings
Attacks on churches in North America
Attacks on religious buildings and structures in the United States
Milwaukee Police Department